St Nicholas Church is a Church of England parish church, and the oldest place of worship in Leicester, England.

Location

It is situated next to the Jewry Wall, a remnant of Roman masonry.  To the east is the site of the Roman forum.

The church lies just outside the city's inner ring road.  Despite being some distance from the campus, it is the official church of the University of Leicester.

History

The tower is Norman. The church itself was consecrated in 879, and in modern times retains almost all of the original nave and crossing tower.

By 1825, the church was in an extremely poor condition, and plans were made for its demolition. Instead, due to lack of funds for the construction of the planned replacement church, it was extensively renovated between 1875 and 1884, including the building of a new north aisle.

Renovation continued into the 20th century. A 15th-century octagonal font from the redundant Church of St Michael the Greater, Stamford was transferred to St Nicholas.

In the 1950s, St Nicholas was directed to the spiritual needs of local university students. In recent times, as a city centre church without a large residential parish, St Nicholas became an Inclusive Church, with a mission to welcome people of diverse sexualities, identities, disabilities, origins, and socioeconomic situations. As a result, it has acquired a significant LGBTQ worshipper population and displays pride flags.

St Nicholas is one of, or the only, church in the UK to have an Ornithologist in Residence, Dr Alexander Bond, principal curator and curator-in-charge of birds at the Natural History Museum, London.

Organ

The organ was built in 1890 by the local firm of J. Porritt, and incorporates pipework of an earlier organ by an unknown builder dating from the 1830s. In 1975, the organ was cleaned and overhauled by J. W. Walker & Sons Ltd at a cost of around £4,500, and has continued to be refurbished periodically since then.

Ian Imlay was the organist from 1960 until his death in August 2021.

Bells

The church has three bells, dated 1617, 1656 and 1710, that had been taken down from the tower in 1949 and replaced by one big bell. As part of the millennium celebrations, the three bells were rehung at a total cost of £5,848, paid for by an appeal. Because the tower is not very strong, they were re-hung for stationary chiming (not swung). The smallest bell, which was cracked, was repaired, and all three bells were taken away to Hayward Mills Associates Bell Hangers of Nottingham. They were returned to the church in July 2002, and were rung to welcome Queen Elizabeth II on her Golden Jubilee visit to Leicester.

References

External links

Official website
Heritage Gateway listed building description

880
9th-century church buildings in England
History of Leicester
Roman Leicester
Saint Nicholas
Grade I listed churches in Leicestershire